The 1872 Rutgers Queensmen football team represented Rutgers University in the 1872 college football season. They finished with a 1–1–1 record.

Schedule

See also
 List of the first college football game in each US state

References

Rutgers
Rutgers Scarlet Knights football seasons
Rutgers Queensmen football